The End of Heartache is the third studio album by American metalcore band Killswitch Engage. It was released on May 11, 2004, through Roadrunner Records. It is the first album to feature lead vocalist Howard Jones and drummer Justin Foley. It received positive acclaim from critics.

Release 
"When Darkness Falls" appeared on the soundtrack to the 2003 horror film Freddy vs. Jason.  The album debuted in the top 40 on the Australian album charts on May 17, 2004, following a successful tour of that country with Anthrax. It won Best Album at the 2004 Metal Hammer Golden Gods Awards. The title track was nominated for Best Metal Performance at the 47th Annual Grammy Awards.

Two music videos: "Rose of Sharyn" and "The End of Heartache" were filmed in promotion of the album. "Rose of Sharyn" had the group performing in a sunny desert with blood dripping from dead branches to form words. "The End of Heartache" featured a darkly lit performance with various computer-animated imagery with scenes from Resident Evil: Apocalypse dotted throughout. Both videos saw notable airplay on Headbangers Ball. The band previously played on the 2003 MTV2 Headbangers Ball Tour.

A special edition of the album was released in 2005 that contained six additional tracks.

The album was certified Gold by the RIAA on December 7, 2007.

Reception
The End of Heartache was ranked number 401 in Rock Hard magazine's book of The 500 Greatest Rock & Metal Albums of All Time in 2005. It received positive reviews from music critics.

Track listing

Personnel
Killswitch Engage
 Howard Jones – lead vocals
 Adam Dutkiewicz – lead guitar, backing vocals, producer, engineering
 Joel Stroetzel – rhythm guitar, backing vocals
 Mike D'Antonio – bass, design, artwork photography, layout
 Justin Foley – drums, percussion

Guest musicians
 Jesse Leach – additional vocals ("Take This Oath" and "Irreversal")
 Phil Labonte – additional vocals ("Hope Is..." and "Irreversal")
 Andy Sneap – additional guitar ("The End of Heartache")

Production
 Chris Fortin – assistant engineer
 Wayne Krupa – assistant engineer
 Andy Sneap – mixing, mastering

Song appearances
 "A Bid Farewell (Live)" is featured on Disc #1 of the compilation MTV2 Headbangers Ball: The Revenge
 The original recording of "When Darkness Falls" is featured on the film soundtrack Freddy vs. Jason
 "The End of Heartache (Resident Evil Version)" is featured on the film soundtrack Resident Evil: Apocalypse; also as the theme song of professional wrestler Roderick Strong and Tyler Black 
 "Rose of Sharyn" is also featured on Disc 1 of the compilation MTV2 Headbangers Ball, Vol. 2
 "The End of Heartache" is a playable song in Guitar Hero: Van Halen, Rock Revolution and Rock Band 3 as DLC with an optional Pro Guitar/Bass download.
 "The End of Heartache" was featured daily as the closing theme song on "Morency" on Hardcore Sports Radio Sirius Satellite Channel 98 from the summer to late fall of 2009; at which time the show was dropped.

Chart positions
Album

Singles

Certifications

Additional information
 Mixed and mastered at Backstage Productions, Ripley, Derbyshire, UK, from January 2004 to February 2004.

References

Killswitch Engage albums
2004 albums
Roadrunner Records albums
Albums produced by Adam Dutkiewicz